Herfried Sabitzer (born 19 October 1969) is a retired Austrian football player who represented the Austria national team. He is the father of footballer Marcel Sabitzer.

Club career
Born in Styria, Sabitzer started his professional career at Alpine Donawitz and scored 9 goals for them in his debut Bundesliga season. That earned him a move to SV Casino Salzburg where he formed a successful strike partnership with Heimo Pfeifenberger before losing his place to Nikola Jurčević. The burly striker moved to LASK Linz and subsequently missed out on the 1994 UEFA Cup Final which Salzburg lost to Internazionale. In 1995, he joined Grazer AK and scored a career-record 15 goals in the 1997/1998 season, earning him a move back to Salzburg. He then lost the Austrian Cup Final in 2000, ironically losing to GAK.

During the 2000/2001 season he went on to play for Second division side Bad Bleiberg and half a season later he moved on to SV Mattersburg. In his last professional season he scored 12 goals to earn Mattersburg promotion to the Austrian Football Bundesliga.

He then finished his playing career at SC Kalsdorf.

International career
He made his debut for Austria in 1992 and earned 6 caps, scoring one goal in a 7–0 UEFA Euro 1996 qualifying victory against Liechtenstein on 26 April 1995. His final international game was a March 1997 friendly match against Slovenia.

External links
 

1966 births
Living people
People from Judenburg
Austrian footballers
Austria international footballers
FC Red Bull Salzburg players
LASK players
Grazer AK players
SV Mattersburg players
Austrian Football Bundesliga players
Association football forwards
Footballers from Styria